Hugh I of Chalon-Arlay (1288–1322) was lord of Arlay and of Vitteaux, and belonged to the house of Chalon-Arlay.  He was the son of lord John I of Chalon-Arlay and his first wife Marguerite of Burgundy (daughter of duke Hugh IV of Burgundy), and his grandfather John, Count of Chalon was count-regent from the death of Otto III, count of Burgundy onwards.  On 13 February 1302 Hugh I married Béatrice de La Tour-du-Pin (1275–1347) (daughter of count Humbert I of Viennois).  They had one child
 John II (1312 – 25 February 1362), who succeeded his father to the lordship of Arlay.

1288 births
1322 deaths
Chalon-Arlay